Taha Yalçıner (born 12 January 1987) is a Turkish footballer who plays for Kuşadasıspor.

References

1987 births
People from Üsküdar
Footballers from Istanbul
Living people
Turkish footballers
Association football midfielders
Fenerbahçe S.K. footballers
Muğlaspor footballers
Karşıyaka S.K. footballers
Adana Demirspor footballers
Samsunspor footballers
Alanyaspor footballers
Akhisarspor footballers
Bandırmaspor footballers
Sarıyer S.K. footballers
Süper Lig players
TFF First League players
TFF Second League players
TFF Third League players